The 97th 2020 Lithuanian Athletics Championships were held in Palanga Stadium, Palanga on 7–8 August 2020. For the first time Lithuanian Championships was open for disabled par-athletes as well. Lithuania become third country in the world and first in Europe were par-athletes competed together with other athletes.

Men's results

Track events

Field Events

Combined events

Women's events

Track Events

Field events

Combined events

References 
Results

External links 
 Lithuanian athletics 

Lithuanian Athletics Championships
Athletics
Lithuanian Athletics Championships